Carlos Lacámara (born November 11, 1958) is a Cuban-born American actor and playwright who has had a long career on American television, making his first appearance in 1983 on the sitcom Family Ties and mostly played in roles as Paco Ortíz on the sitcom Nurses, and as Ray García, the family patriarch on The Brothers García.

Early life
Lacámara was born in Havana, Cuba but moved to Washington, D.C. in 1960 because of the Cuban Revolution. After that, he moved to Puerto Rico, and then to California, where he resides now. He attended UCLA.

Career
His recent guest roles have shifted from the early trend to cast him as a waiter, valet, or other entry level worker.

Although characters from Nurses occasionally appeared on Empty Nest, from which their show had originated, Lacámara's only appearance on Empty Nest was in an unrelated role in 1995, after Nurses had ended its run. Lacámara's role in The Brothers García reunited him with former Nurses co-star Ada Maris.

In 2006, Lacámara's play Nowhere on the Border won first place of Repertorio Español's, a theatre company in New York, MetLife Nuestras Voces National Playwriting Competition. The play was produced at Repertorio Español in the fall of 2007. His second play Havana Bourgeois won Reverie Productions' Next Generations Playwriting Contest, and was produced by Reverie at 59E59 Theaters in New York in 2007, and later played in Los Angeles, California and Coral Gables, FL.

Lacámara wrote the book and additional lyrics for the musical "Cuba Libre", which is first produced by Artists Repertory Theatre in Portland, Oregon in October 2015. This Broadway-scale, contemporary musical features the internationally acclaimed, three-time Grammy nominated band Tiempo Libre with a company of 21 actors, dancers and musicians.

Filmography

References

External links

1958 births
American male film actors
American male television actors
Cuban emigrants to the United States
Hispanic and Latino American dramatists and playwrights
Living people
People from Havana
University of California, Los Angeles alumni